This article displays the squads for the participating teams at the 2015 African Games (men's handball tournament).

Angola
2015 African Games Men's Handball - Silver medal   Head coach:  Filipe Cruz

Congo
2015 African Games Men's Handball - Bronze medal  Head coach:  Grégoire Nganga

DR Congo
2015 African Games Men's Handball - 9th place  Head coach:  Abou Samba Gumba

Egypt
2015 African Games Men's Handball - Gold medal  Head coach:  Marwan Moustafa

Gabon
2015 African Games Men's Handball - 6th place   Head coach:  Joseph Berhaud Blanco

Ivory Coast
2015 African Games Men's Handball - 7th place   Head coach:  Ségbo Dominique

Kenya
2015 African Games Men's Handball - 10th place  Head coach:  Peter Mwathi

Libya
2015 African Games Men's Handball - 5th place  Head coach:  Boughalia Mahmoud

Nigeria
2015 African Games Men's Handball - 4th place   Head coach:  Fidelis Obi

Senegal
2015 African Games Men's Handball - 8th place  Head coach:  Djibril Diagne

References

Handball at the 2015 African Games